Brean is a village and civil parish between Weston-super-Mare and Burnham-on-Sea in Somerset, England. The name is derived from "Bryn" Brythonic and Modern Welsh for a hill and it has a population of 635.

The village is on a strip of land between the sea and the River Axe. It is the home of Brean Leisure Park, a tropical bird garden, other tourist attractions and several caravan parks. The sandy beach has been used for land sailing since 1970. Sometimes, Brean can also be linked with the nearby village, Berrow so the villages can also be called Berrow & Brean.

History

Brean was part of the hundred of Bempstone. 
During the Bristol Channel floods of 1607 the village was flooded, with seven of its nine houses being destroyed and 26 inhabitants drowned.

Windmill House, on South Road, was one of the terminuses for the PTAT-1 transatlantic communications cable from Manasquan, New Jersey, United States. 
It was constructed in 1989 by Mercury Communications and closed in 2004.

Governance

The parish council has responsibility for local issues, including setting an annual precept (local rate) to cover the council's operating costs and producing annual accounts for public scrutiny. The parish council evaluates local planning applications and works with the local police, district council officers, and neighbourhood watch groups on matters of crime, security, and traffic. The parish council's role also includes initiating projects for the maintenance and repair of parish facilities, as well as consulting with the district council on the maintenance, repair, and improvement of highways, drainage, footpaths, public transport, and street cleaning. Conservation matters (including trees and listed buildings) and environmental issues are also the responsibility of the council.

The village falls within the Non-metropolitan district of Sedgemoor, which was formed on 1 April 1974 under the Local Government Act 1972, having previously been part of Axbridge Rural District, which is responsible for local planning and building control, local roads, council housing, environmental health, markets and fairs, refuse collection and recycling, cemeteries and crematoria, leisure services, parks, and tourism.

Somerset County Council is responsible for running the largest and most expensive local services such as education, social services, libraries, main roads, public transport, policing and fire services, trading standards, waste disposal and strategic planning.

It is also part of the Wells county constituency represented in the House of Commons of the Parliament of the United Kingdom. It elects one Member of Parliament (MP) by the first past the post system of election, and was part of the South West England constituency of the European Parliament prior to Britain leaving the European Union in January 2020, which elected seven MEPs using the d'Hondt method of party-list proportional representation.

Religious sites

The Church of St Bridget dates from the 13th century, but the fabric is predominantly from the 15th century and was extensively rebuilt around 1882. It is designated by English Heritage as a Grade II* listed building. The dedication to St Bridget of Ireland, Abbess of Kildare, who died in 525, is an indication of a Celtic Christian settlement.

Gallery

References

External links

Brean Parish Council web site
 
 

Villages in Sedgemoor
Seaside resorts in England
Somerset Levels
Civil parishes in Somerset
Populated coastal places in Somerset
Beaches of Somerset